King-to Nin Jiom Pei Pa Koa, commonly known as Nin Jiom Pei Pa Koa or simply Nin Jiom Herbal Cough Syrup, is a traditional Chinese natural herbal remedy used for the relief of sore throat, coughs, hoarseness and aphonia. It is a throat demulcent and expectorant.

Naming
In the name of the company, king-to means "capital", referring to Peking, and nin jiom means "in memory of my mother"; hence, it stresses the important virtue of filial piety. Pei pa koa means "loquat syrup".

The product is marketed under the brand name Cap Ibu dan Anak (Malay for "Mother and Son Brand", referring to the brand's logo) in Malaysia and Indonesia, also acronymed as OBIDA (as in Obat Batuk Ibu dan Anak) in the latter country.

History
The formula for pei pa koa was reportedly created by Dr. Ip Tin-See, a Ch'ing Dynasty physician born in 1680. Yang Chin, a county commander, asked Doctor Ip to treat his mother's persistent cough. They were so impressed that they created a factory to mass-produce it. In 1946, the Yang family sold the business to Tse Sui-Bong, a medicine practitioner, who founded the Nin Jiom Medicine Manufactory. The company was formally incorporated in 1962, and continue to manufacture and sell the product worldwide. 
The headquarters of the company is located in Hong Kong and Taoyuan, Taiwan.

Availability and marketing of the product expanded in the 1980s, and today it is easily found in North America, most often in Chinese groceries and herbal stores.

Pei pa koa had annual sales of HK$350 million in 2014.

Effectiveness

A study at the China Academy of Traditional Chinese Medicine published in a 1994 article, "Pharmacological studies of nin jion pei pa koa", states that Nin Jiom Pei Pa Koa had significant cough relieving and sputum removing effects. In four acute or sub-acute inflammatory models, the anti-inflammatory effect was marked.

Composition
Pei pa koa is made up of a blend of herbal ingredients including the fritillary bulb (Bulbus fritillariae cirrhosae), loquat leaf (Eriobotrya japonica), fourleaf ladybell root (Adenophora tetraphylla), Indian bread (Wolfiporia extensa)), pomelo peel (Citrus maxima), chinese bellflower root (Platycodon grandiflorum), pinellia rhizome (Pinellia ternata), Schisandra seed (Schisandra chinensis), Trichosanthes seed (Trichosanthes kirilowii), coltsfoot flower (Tussilago farfara), Thinleaf Milkwort root (Polygala tenuifolia), bitter apricot kernel (Prunus armeniaca), fresh ginger (Zingiber officinale), licorice root (Glycyrrhiza uralensis), and menthol in a syrup and honey base.

See also
 Cough medicine

References

External links
Official company site

Traditional Chinese medicine